The following lists events in the year 2017 in South Sudan.

Incumbents
 President: Salva Kiir Mayardit
 Vice President: James Wani Igga

Events

February
20 February – The South Sudan government and the United Nations declared a famine in parts of Unity State, affecting more than 100,000 people, and fearing the famine could spread significantly as the order of one million people are threatened.

Deaths

4 January – Gabriel Tang, rebel militia leader, killed in Civil War.

References

 
Years of the 21st century in South Sudan
South Sudan
South Sudan
2010s in South Sudan